Levi Samuel G. Douglas (born 1 September 1995 in England) is a rugby union player for FC Grenoble Rugby.

References

Living people
1995 births
English rugby union players
Bath Rugby players
Rugby union locks